Elina Svitolina was the defending champion, but chose not to participate this year.

Timea Bacsinszky won the title, defeating Marina Erakovic in the final, 6–2, 6–1.

Seeds

Draw

Finals

Top half

Bottom half

Qualifying

Seeds

Qualifiers

Lucky losers

Draw

First qualifier

Second qualifier

Third  qualifier

Fourth  qualifier

References 
 Main draw
 Qualifying draw

Grand Prix SAR La Princesse Lalla Meryem Singles
2016 Women's Singles
2016 in Moroccan tennis